Amphisbaena cuiabana is a species of worm lizards found in Brazil.

References

cuiabana
Reptiles described in 2001
Taxa named by Christine Strüssman
Taxa named by Marcos André de Carvalho
Endemic fauna of Brazil
Reptiles of Brazil